Montarville  is a federal electoral district in the Montérégie region of Quebec, Canada, that has been represented in the House of Commons of Canada since 2015.

Montarville was created by the 2012 federal electoral boundaries redistribution and was legally defined in the 2013 representation order. It came into effect upon the call of the 42nd Canadian federal election, scheduled for 19 October 2015. It was created out of parts of the electoral districts of Saint-Bruno—Saint-Hubert, Verchères—Les Patriotes and Chambly—Borduas.

Profile
Similarly to other South Shore ridings, Montarville has recently become more of a competition between the Bloc Québécois and the Liberals despite an NDP win in 2011 and strong showing in 2015. The wealthier and more Anglophone city of Saint-Bruno-de-Montarville tends to be more Liberal, while the Bloc performs better in Longueuil and Sainte-Julie.

Demographics
According to the Canada 2016 Census
 Languages: (2016) 89.5% French, 4.4% English, 1.5% Spanish, 0.5% Romanian, 0.4% Portuguese, 0.3% Creole, 0.3% Italian, 0.2% Persian, 0.2% Russian, 0.2% Mandarin

Members of Parliament
This riding has elected the following Members of Parliament:

Election results

References

Quebec federal electoral districts
Politics of Longueuil
Saint-Bruno-de-Montarville
Marguerite-D'Youville Regional County Municipality